South Dakota Circuit is a permanent motor racing track in Timehri, behind the Cheddi Jagan International Airport, Guyana. It is operated by the Guyana Motor Racing & Sports Club. The circuit hosts national circuit racing including the GMR&SC Skyline Mortgage Caribbean Race of Champions and various drag racing events. On May 9, 2008, the Stabroek News published a letter from a reader that suggested that the circuit lacks adequate washroom facilities.

References

External links
50 years of motor racing in Guyana
Racing goes around in cycles in my family
GMR&SC Skyline Mortgage Caribbean Race of Champions
Canadian Motorbike Racers Compete In Guyana

Motorsport venues in Guyana
Sports venues in Guyana